Mandevilla jamesonii is a species of plant in the family Apocynaceae. It is endemic to Ecuador.  Its natural habitat is subtropical or tropical moist montane forests. It is threatened by habitat loss.

References

jamesonii
Endemic flora of Ecuador
Critically endangered flora of South America
Taxonomy articles created by Polbot